Ortensia can refer to:

 Ortensia the Cat, an animated cat created by Ub Iwerks and Walt Disney.
 Ortensia (horse), an Australian thoroughbred racehorse.